The 2002 NCAA Division I women's basketball tournament concluded on March 31, 2002 when Connecticut won the national title.  The Final Four was held at the Alamodome in San Antonio, Texas on March 29–31, 2002. UConn, coached by Geno Auriemma, defeated Oklahoma 82-70 in the championship game.

Notable events
After wins in the first three rounds, Connecticut faced Old Dominion in the Mideast regional finals. The opening 16 minutes were described as "near-perfect", as the Huskies hit over 90% of their shots (19 of 21) and too had a 49–28 lead. That 21 point margin would match the final margin, as the Huskies would move on to the Final Four. Sue Bird scored 26 points, a career high, and eleven assist. The team recorded 25 assists, which brought their season total to 811, a new NCAA season record.

In the other three regions all the number one seeds, Tennessee, Oklahoma and Duke all advanced to the Final Four. A dozen years earlier, Oklahoma attempted to eliminate the women's basketball program, but now the program had advanced to their first final four, and faced Duke in one semifinal game. Duke opened the game with a 13–7 run, but the Sooners responded with 12 consecutive points. Oklahoma managed to get to a 17-point lead in the second half, but Duke cut the lead to only two points with just under eight minutes to go. Oklahoma responded with a 16–3 run to take a decisive lead, and won the game 86–71 to head to the National Championship game.

In the other semifinal, UConn faced Tennessee. Although Tennessee scored first, but that would be the last time they would lead. The Huskies responded, opened up an early lead, and extended it to 13 points at halftime. Connecticut extended the lead in the beginning of the second half, with a 24–11 run, and went on to hold the Lady Vols to 31% shooting. No Tennessee player scored in double digits; Kara Lawson led the team with nine points. The win extended the perfect season by Connecticut to 38 games, while marking  the fourth time in the last five meetings that the Huskies had beaten the Lady Vols.

In the championship game, the Sooners were out rebounded and outshot, but did not give up. Oklahoma did not give up a single three point shot, the first time that has occurred in an NCAA title game, and the last time that would happen to the Connecticut team in any game for over a decade. With a minute and a half to go, the Huskies held a lead, but only six points. UConn had the ball, and despite having four  seniors on the floor who would go 1,2 4 and 6 in the 2002 WNBA Draft, gave the ball to sophomore Diana Taurasi, who backed down Oklahoma's Stacy Dales then took a turn around jumper than went in, while Dales fouled Taurasi to foul out of the game. Taurasi hit the foul shot to extend the lead to nine points, and the Huskies would go on to be the first team in history to record two undefeated seasons, winning their third National Championship.

Tournament records
 Fewest turnovers – Louisiana Tech committed only three turnovers in the East regional first-round game against UC Santa Barbara, setting the record for fewest turnovers in an NCAA tournament game. Unfortunately for the Lady Techsters, the low number of turnovers could not prevent UCSB from winning.
 Free throws – Sue Bird hit 20 free throws out of 20 attempts, one of several players to hit 100% of their free throws in an NCAA tournament; 20 is the largest such total. 
 Assists – Connecticut recorded 128 assists, setting the record for most assists in an NCAA tournament
 Blocks – Connecticut recorded 53 blocks, setting the record for blocks in an NCAA tournament

Qualifying teams – automatic
Sixty-four teams were selected to participate in the 2002 NCAA Tournament. Thirty-one conferences were eligible for an automatic bid to the 2002 NCAA tournament.

Qualifying teams – at-large
Thirty-three additional teams were selected to complete the sixty-four invitations.

Bids by conference
Thirty-one conferences earned an automatic bid.  In twenty-one cases, the automatic bid was the only representative from the conference. Thirty-three additional at-large teams were selected from ten of the conferences.

First and second rounds

In 2002, the field remained at 64 teams. The teams were seeded, and assigned to four geographic regions, with seeds 1-16 in each region. In Round 1, seeds 1 and 16 faced each other, as well as seeds 2 and 15, seeds 3 and 14, seeds 4 and 13, seeds 5 and 12, seeds 6 and 11, seeds 7 and 10, and seeds 8 and 9. In the first two rounds, the top four seeds were given the opportunity to host the first-round game. In all cases, the higher seed accepted the opportunity.

The following table lists the region, host school, venue and the sixteen first and second round locations:

Regionals and Final Four

The Regionals, named for the general location, were held from March 23 to March 25 at these sites:

 Midwest Regional  Hilton Coliseum, Ames, Iowa (Host: Iowa State University)
 East Regional  PNC Arena,  Raleigh, North Carolina (Host: North Carolina State University)
 Mideast Regional  U.S. Cellular Arena, Milwaukee, Wisconsin (Host: Marquette University)
 West Regional  Taco Bell Arena, Boise, Idaho (Host: Boise State University)

Each regional winner advanced to the Final Four held March 29 and March 31 in San Antonio, Texas at the  Alamodome, (Host: University of Texas at San Antonio)

Bids by state

The sixty-four teams came from thirty states. Texas had the most teams with five bids. Twenty states did not have any teams receiving bids.

Brackets
Data Source

Mideast Region - Milwaukee, Wisconsin

Midwest Region - Ames, Iowa

West Region - Boise, Idaho

East Region - Raleigh, North Carolina

Final Four – San Antonio, Texas 

E-East; ME-Mideast; MW-Midwest; W-West*-denotes one overtime

Record by conference

Eighteen conferences went 0-1: America East, Atlantic 10, Atlantic Sun Conference, Big Sky Conference, Big South Conference, Horizon League, Ivy League,  MAAC, MAC,  Mid-Continent, MEAC, Northeast Conference, Ohio Valley Conference,  Patriot League, Southern Conference, Southland,  SWAC, and WAC

All-Tournament team

 Swin Cash, Connecticut
 Sue Bird, Connecticut
 Asjha Jones, Connecticut
 Stacey Dales, Oklahoma
 Rosalind Ross, Oklahoma

Game officials

 Dennis DeMayo   (semifinal)
 Barb Smith (semifinal)
 Bryan Enterline (semifinal)
 Sally Bell (semifinal)
 Lawson Newton (semifinal)
 Angie Lewis (semifinal)
 Scott Yarbrough (final)
 Melissa Barlow (final)
 Lisa Mattingly (final)

See also
 NCAA Women's Division I Basketball Championship
 2002 NCAA Division I men's basketball tournament
 2002 NAIA Division I men's basketball tournament

Notes 

NCAA Division I women's basketball tournament
Tournament
NCAA Division I women's basketball tournament
Basketball competitions in Austin, Texas
Basketball competitions in Lubbock, Texas
Basketball competitions in San Antonio
Basketball in Waco, Texas